Jean Champion (9 March 1917 – 23 May 2001) was a French film actor. He appeared in 60 films between 1962 and 1996.

Partial filmography

 Cléo from 5 to 7 (1962) - Le patron du café (uncredited)
 The Longest Day (1962) - French Resistance Fighter (uncredited)
 Muriel (1963) - Ernest
 La foire aux cancres (Chronique d'une année scolaire) (1963)
 Le journal d'un fou (1963)
 The Umbrellas of Cherbourg (1964) - Aubin
 Monsieur (1964) - Le patron de l'hôtel
 The Thief of Paris (1967) - Le patron de l' Hôtel de la Biche
 Mise à sac (1967) - Kerini
 La chasse royale (1969) - Metzer
 Le Cercle rouge (1970) - Le garde-barrière
 La Cavale (1971) - Le directeur de la prison
 Mais qui donc m'a fait ce bébé? (1971)
 Les caïds (1972)
 The Invitation (1973) - Alfred
 Day for Night (1973) - Bertrand, le producteur
 The Day of the Jackal (1973) - Detective (uncredited)
 Section spéciale (1975) - L'avocat général Léon Guyenot
 Monsieur Klein (1976) - Le gardien de la morgue
 March or Die (1977) - Minister
 Le Crabe-tambour (1977) - L'homme dans le café
 L'Honorable Société (1978) - Gaston de Marcilly
 Le sucre (1978)
 Félicité (1979) - Le médecin
 Retour en force (1980) - Un membre de l'amicale de la R.A.T.P.
 Une robe noire pour un tueur (1981) - Le père de reynolds
 Viens chez moi, j'habite chez une copine (1981) - Le patron du Taxi-frêt
 The Games of Countess Dolingen (1981) - Un convive
 Le Maître d'école (1981) - L'inspecteur
 Coup de Torchon (1981) - Priest
 Les fantômes du chapelier (1982) - Le sénateur Laude
 The Blood of Others (1984) - Liftier Meurice
 L'amour à mort (1984) - (voice)
 Bernadette (1988) - Un chanoine
 Life and Nothing But (1989) - Lagrange
 I Want to Go Home (1989) - Le chauffeur de taxi / Taxi driver
 Les Anges gardiens (1995) - Grand-père du Père Tarain

References

External links

1917 births
2001 deaths
People from Chalon-sur-Saône
French male film actors
20th-century French male actors